Évora Airport  is a municipal airport that serves the city of Évora, Portugal.

The second runway, 08/26, is a short sand strip that is rarely used.

Among the services available are a Flight Information Service (FIS), runway lighting (01/19), and a non-directional beacon (NDB) with an approved locator approach to runway 19.

A flying school - CAE Global Academy Évora (Former Academia Aeronáutica de Évora / Aeronautical Academy of Europe) - owned by CAE and part of the CAE Global Academy was based at the airport between late 2000 and December 2012, when it ceased operations.

It is also a popular site for parachuting and glider activities, especially during weekends. 
Évora Airport hosted the biannual Portugal Air Show several times up to 2009.

Brazilian aircraft manufacturer Embraer has built two plants just next to the airport, where it builds parts for their Legacy 500 and KC-390 aircraft. The €180M facility was completed August 2012, with production starting early 2013.

See also
 Transport in Portugal
 List of airports in Portugal

References

External links
Official website 
Airliners.net - Photos taken at Évora airport

Airports in Portugal
Buildings and structures in Évora District